Jean-Noël Ferrari (born 7 September 1974 in Nice) is a French fencer. He won a gold medal in team foil at the 2000 Summer Olympics in Sydney, Athens, together with Lionel Plumenail, Brice Guyart and Patrice Lhotellier.

Olympic results

References

External links

1974 births
Living people
French male foil fencers
Olympic fencers of France
Olympic gold medalists for France
Fencers at the 2000 Summer Olympics
Fencers at the 2004 Summer Olympics
Olympic medalists in fencing
Sportspeople from Nice
Medalists at the 2000 Summer Olympics
21st-century French people